"First Comes Love" is a single by Canadian country music artist George Fox. Released in 1995, it was the second single from his album Time of My Life. The song reached #1 on the RPM Country Tracks chart in July 1995.

Chart performance

Year-end charts

References

1995 singles
George Fox songs
Songs written by Bob Gaudio
Song recordings produced by Bob Gaudio
Songs written by George Fox (singer)